Kompa may refer to:

 Kompa, Benin, a town and arrondissement in Benin
 Kompas, an Indonesian newspaper

See also
 Kompa, a popular Haitian musical genre